The Banco Nacional de Comercio Exterior (English: National Exterior Commerce Bank) or "Bancomext" is a Mexican state-owned bank and export credit agency created in 1937 to promote and finance small and medium exporting Mexican companies in international markets as well as providing Consulting services for small and medium companies wishing to export their goods and/or services.

Bancomext is an instrument of the Mexican government used to increase the competitiveness of Mexican companies, primarily small and medium-sized enterprises involved in exports and/or imports. Bancomext provides training services, information, financial assistance, project coordination and financing.

External links

 Official site

Banks established in 1937
Banks of Mexico
Export credit agencies
Companies based in Mexico City
Government of Mexico
Mexican brands
Mexican companies established in 1937